Koorainghat is a coastal town in New South Wales, Australia in Mid-Coast Council.

References

Mid North Coast
Towns in New South Wales
Suburbs of Mid-Coast Council